
Gmina Lipno is a rural gmina (administrative district) in Leszno County, Greater Poland Voivodeship, in west-central Poland.

Villages
Gmina Lipno contains the villages and settlements of Błotkowo, Boża Pomoc, Goniembice, Górka Duchowna, Gronówko, Janopol, Karolewko, Karolówko, Klonówiec, Koronowo, Lipno, Maryszewice, Mórkowo, Radomicko, Ratowice, Smyczyna, Sulejewo, Targowisko, Wilkowice, Wilkowo-Gaj, Wyciążkowo and Żakowo.

Neighbouring gminas
Gmina Lipno is bordered by the city of Leszno and by the gminas of Osieczna, Śmigiel, Święciechowa and Włoszakowice.

References
Polish official population figures 2006

Lipno
Gmina Lipno